The 2022 El Paso Locomotive FC season is the fourth season for El Paso Locomotive FC in the USL Championship (USL-C), the second-tier professional soccer league in the United States and Canada. El Paso Locomotive FC also participates in the U.S. Open Cup and competes with all other professional teams in Texas for the Copa Tejas.

Kits

Roster

Transfers

In

Out

Loans In

Competitions

USL Championship

Standings — Western Conference

Match results

USL Championship Playoffs

For the first time in their history, Locomotive did not qualify for playoffs.

U.S. Open Cup

Statistics 

Numbers after plus-sign(+) denote appearances as a substitute.

Appearances and goals

Top scorers
{| class="wikitable" style="font-size: 95%; text-align: center;"
|-
!width=30|Rank
!width=30|Position
!width=30|Number
!width=175|Name
!width=75|
!width=75|
!width=75|
!width=75|Total
|-
|1
|FW
|9
|align="left"|
|16
|0
|1
|17
|-
|2
|MF
|10
|align="left"|
|10
|0
|0
|10
|-
|rowspan=2|3
|MF
|8
|align="left"|
|6
|0
|1
|7
|-
|FW
|7
|align="left"|
|6
|0
|0
|6
|-
|5
|MF
|15
|align="left"|
|4
|0
|0
|4
|-
|6
|DF
|4
|align="left"|
|3
|0
|0
|3
|-
|rowspan="2"|7
|DF
|2
|align="left"|
|2
|0
|0
|2
|-
|DF
|31
|align="left"|
|2
|0
|0
|2
|-
|rowspan="5"|9
|DF
|17
|align="left"|
|1
|0
|0
|1
|-
|FW
|17
|align="left"|
|1
|0
|0
|1
|-
|MF
|21
|align="left"|
|1
|0
|0
|1
|-
|MF
|23
|align="left"|
|1
|0
|0
|1
|-
|MF
|77
|align="left"|
|1
|0
|0
|1
|-
!colspan="4"|Total
! 54
! 0
! 1
! 55

Top assists
{| class="wikitable" style="font-size: 95%; text-align: center;"
|-
!width=30|Rank
!width=30|Position
!width=30|Number
!width=175|Name
!width=75|
!width=75|
!width=75|
!width=75|Total
|-
|rowspan=3|1
|FW
|7
|align="left"| Aarón Gómez
|7
|0
|0
|7
|-
|MF
|17
|align="left"| Ricardo Zacarías
|7
|0
|0
|7
|-
|DF
|5
|align="left"| Éder Borelli
|6
|0
|1
|7
|-
|rowspan=2|4
|DF
|10
|align="left"| Dylan Mares
|5
|0
|0
|5
|-
|FW
|9
|align="left"| Luis Solignac
|5
|0
|0
|5
|-
|rowspan=3|6
|MF
|6
|align="left"| Richie Ryan
|2
|0
|0
|2
|-
|MF
|15
|align="left"| Diego Luna
|2
|0
|0
|2
|-
|MF
|21
|align="left"| Emmanuel Sonupe
|2
|0
|0
|2
|-
|rowspan="6"|9
|MF
|8
|align="left"| Eric Calvillo
|1
|0
|0
|1
|-
|MF
|4
|align="left"| Andrew Fox
|1
|0
|0
|1
|-
|MF
|15
|align="left"| Sebastian Velasquez
|1
|0
|0
|1
|-
|MF
|15
|align="left"| Christiano François
|1
|0
|0
|1
|-
|MF
|22
|align="left"| Liam Rose
|1
|0
|0
|1
|-
|FW
|53
|align="left"| Noe Coutino
|1
|0
|0
|1
|-
!colspan="4"|Total
! 42
! 0
! 1
! 43

Disciplinary record
{| class="wikitable" style="text-align:center;"
|-
| rowspan="2" !width=15|
| rowspan="2" !width=15|
| rowspan="2" !width=120|Player
| colspan="3"|USL Championship
| colspan="3"|USL Playoffs
| colspan="3"|U.S. Open Cup
| colspan="3"|Total
|-
!width=34; background:#fe9;|
!width=34; background:#fe9;|
!width=34; background:#ff8888;|
!width=34; background:#fe9;|
!width=34; background:#fe9;|
!width=34; background:#ff8888;|
!width=34; background:#fe9;|
!width=34; background:#fe9;|
!width=34; background:#ff8888;|
!width=34; background:#fe9;|
!width=34; background:#fe9;|
!width=34; background:#ff8888;|
|-
|1
|GK
|align="left"| Evan Newton
|1||0||0||0||0||0||0||0||0||1||0||0
|-
|2
|DF
|align="left"| Harry Brockbank
|5||0||0||0||0||0||1||0||0||6||0||0
|-
|4
|DF
|align="left"| Andrew Fox
|8||0||0||0||0||0||0||0||0||8||0||0
|-
|5
|DF
|align="left"| Éder Borelli
|10||0||0||0||0||0||1||0||0||11||0||0
|-
|6
|MF
|align="left"| Richie Ryan
|7||0||0||0||0||0||1||0||0||8||0||0
|-
|7
|FW
|align="left"| Aarón Gómez
|9||0||0||0||0||0||1||0||0||10||0||0
|-
|8
|MF
|align="left"| Eric Calvillo
|3||0||0||0||0||0||1||0||0||3||0||0
|-
|9
|FW
|align="left"| Luis Solignac
|4||2||0||0||0||0||0||0||0||4||2||0
|-
|10
|MF
|align="left"| Dylan Mares
|4||0||0||0||0||0||0||0||0||4||0||0
|-
|11
|MF
|align="left"| Sebastian Velasquez
|1||0||0||0||0||0||0||0||0||1||0||0
|-
|12
|FW
|align="left"| Shavon John-Brown
|1||0||0||0||0||0||0||1||0||1||1||0
|-
|13
|DF
|align="left"| Matt Bahner
|8||0||0||0||0||0||0||0||0||8||0||0
|-
|14
|DF
|align="left"| Ander Egiluz
|6||0||0||0||0||0||0||0||0||6||0||0
|-
|15
|MF
|align="left"| Diego Luna
|5||0||0||0||0||0||0||0||0||5||0||0
|-
|17
|FW
|align="left"| Ricardo Zacarías
|7||0||0||0||0||0||1||0||0||8||0||0
|-
|18
|FW
|align="left"| Christopher Garcia
|1||0||0||0||0||0||1||0||0||1||0||0
|-
|20
|MF
|align="left"| Chapa Herrera
|2||0||0||0||0||0||0||0||0||2||0||0
|-
|21
|MF
|align="left"| Emmanuel Sonupe
|2||0||0||0||0||0||0||0||0||2||0||0
|-
|22
|MF
|align="left"| Liam Rose
|3||0||0||0||0||0||0||0||0||3||0||0
|-
|23
|MF
|align="left"| Christiano François
|3||0||0||0||0||0||0||0||0||3||0||0
|-
|24
|MF
|align="left"| Yuma
|11||1||0||0||0||0||0||0||0||11||1||0
|-
|28
|MF
|align="left"| Edison Azcona
|3||0||0||0||0||0||0||0||0||3||0||0
|-
|31
|DF
|align="left"| Nick Hinds
|4||0||0||0||0||0||0||0||0||4||0||0
|-
|33
|MF
|align="left"| Martín Payares
|2||0||0||0||0||0||0||0||0||2||0||0
|-
|50
|MF
|align="left"| Diego Garcia
|1||0||0||0||0||0||0||0||0||1||0||0
|-
|88
|MF
|align="left"| Joel Maldanado
|1||0||0||0||0||0||0||0||0||1||0||0
|-
|colspan="3"|Total||108||3||0||0||0||0||6||1||0||114||4||0

References

El Paso Locomotive FC
El Paso
El Paso
El Paso Locomotive